Kailangan Kita is a 2002 Filipino film that tackles a beautiful love story shot in the province of Albay. Claudine Barretto plays the lead role Lena, a simple lady in the province and Aga Muhlach as Carl a Filipino working in the United States who made a visit in Albay to fix his wedding with Lena's elder sister. This movie is under Rory Quintos' direction and produced by Star Cinema (ABS-CBN film productions).

This is the only film to feature Claudine Barretto without her on-screen partner Rico Yan 9 months after his death in March.

Synopsis
New York-based celebrity chef Carl Diesta is coming home to the Philippines after being away for seventeen long years to marry his fiancée, supermodel Chrissy Duran, in her hometown of Albay province. With Chrissy still being held up somewhere in Europe for a photo shoot, Carl has to meet her family by himself and instantly impresses everyone except for Chrissy's father, Papay Rogelio. Here Carl gets to meet Chrissy's other sister - Lena. Through Lena, Carl has now come to terms with his forcibly forgotten identity - both as a son and as a Filipino. Lena has also awaken a love in Carl that he has never felt before.

Cast
Aga Muhlach as Carl "Caloy" Diesta
Claudine Barretto as Elena "Lena" Duran
Jericho Rosales as Abel
Johnny Delgado as Rogelio Duran
Liza Lorena as Consuelo Duran
Dante Rivero as Ka Pinong (Carl's Father)
Cris Villanueva as Father Ruben
Gerald Madrid as Mario
Rissa Mananquil-Samson as Crissy Duran 
Ces Quesada as Lucci Dellosa
Igi Boy Flores as Buboy Duran
Farrah Florer as Sylvia
Mads Nicolas as Elvie Mirandilla
Cholo Escaño as Sonny Duran
Nicole Judalena as Giselle Duran
Idda Yaneza as Martha

References

External links

2002 films
Star Cinema romance films
Philippine romance films
Filipino-language films
2000s romance films
Films directed by Rory Quintos